Fausto De Amicis (born 26 June 1968) is an Australian former soccer player. He was a member of the Australian national team that scored a record 31 goals against American Samoa in a FIFA World Cup qualifier. Overall, De Amicis was involved in four National Soccer League title winning sides, twice with the Melbourne Knights, and twice with South Melbourne. In the latter's 1998 Grand Final win over Carlton, De Amicis was awarded the Joe Marston Medal for best afield.

Playing career
De Amicis made his debut for Australia against Chile in February 1998, at the age of 29.

International goals

Coaching career
After the departure of Moreland Zebras senior head coach Danny Gnjidic at the end of the 2016 NPL2 West season, the club appointed former player De Amicis as the new manager.

Honours

Player
Melbourne Knights
National Soccer League Champion: 1995, 1996

South Melbourne
National Soccer League Champion: 1998, 1999

External links
OzFootball profile

References

1968 births
Living people
Australian soccer players
Australia international soccer players
National Soccer League (Australia) players
Brunswick Juventus players
Melbourne Knights FC players
South Melbourne FC players
Australian people of Italian descent
Association football defenders
1998 OFC Nations Cup players
2000 OFC Nations Cup players
2002 OFC Nations Cup players
Soccer players from Melbourne